No. 6 Squadron  (Dragons) is a fighter squadron and is equipped with Jaguar IM/IS and based at Jamnagar Air Force Station.

History

No. 6 Squadron is one of the ten senior squadrons of the Indian Air Force. Formed prior to independence, its varied roles have included air-sea rescue, counter-air, fighter-reconnaissance, maritime reconnaissance, maritime strike, target towing and transport.

The squadron was formed as a fighter-reconnaissance unit at Trichinopoly (now Tiruchirapally) on 1 December 1942 under the command of Squadron Leader (later Air Commodore) Mehar Singh. It participated in the Indian Air Force's tenth anniversary review at Ambala, and received an award for "the best looking aircraft". The squadron continued working-up, until November that year.

In November 1943, flying Hawker Hurricane FR.IIb No 6 Squadron IAF moved to Cox's Bazar as a part of the RAF Third Tactical Air Force (Third TAF) for the Second Arakan Campaign. During this campaign, No 6 Squadron was the only specialist reconnaissance unit available to support the Fourteenth Army on this front, earning the name "The Eyes of the Fourteenth Army". They were also dubbed "the Arakan Twins" for flying in the standard tactical reconnaissance pairing of Leader and Weaver. Returning from his Arakan Front visit in mid-January 1944, General Sir William Slim, GOC Fourteenth Army, wrote in his memoirs how impressed he was with this reconnaissance squadron.

For services during the squadron's tour of operations, Flight-Lieutenant Rawal Singh was awarded the MBE, and Sergeant BM Kothari, the head of the photographic section, received the British Empire Medal. In addition, Flying Officer (later Air Commodore) JD Aquino and Pilot Officer (later Wing Commander) LRD Blunt were commended by the Air Officer Commanding.

Assignments
Burma Campaign
Indo-Pakistani War of 1965
Indo-Pakistani War of 1971

Aircraft

References

006
Military units and formations of India in World War II
1942 establishments in India